Sareh Javanmardi (born 5 December 1984) is an Iranian Paralympic shooter from Shiraz, Iran. Also known as Sareh Javanmardidodmani or Sareh Javanmardi Dodmani, she is the first ever female gold medalist from Iran to win in the shooting category of the Paralympics Games.

Career 
In 2012 Paralympic Games held in London, she won a bronze medal in P2 (10m air pistol SH1).

Later in 2014, she was chosen as the best Asian female athlete with impairments by the Asian Paralympic Committee. It was due to the two gold medals she won at the 2014 Asian Para Games held in Incheon, South Korea.

At the 2016 Summer Paralympics on 9 September, she scored 193.4 points to win the gold medal at the Rio de Janeiro in the P2 10m air pistol competition.

According to the Islamic Republic News Agency she won her first medal on Friday. In 2014, she will take part at the 2014 IPC Shooting World Cup which takes place in Szczecin, Poland. There, she will compete against Olivera Nakovska-Bikova of Macedonia.

Awards 
 Voted as the Allianz Best Female Athlete of the Rio 2016 Paralympic Games
 Chosen as best Asian female athlete with impairments in 2014 by the Asian Paralympic Committee.

Results
https://olympics.com/tokyo-2020/paralympic-games/en/results/shooting/athlete-profile-n1565173-javanmardi-sareh.htm

Paralympic Games

1	P2 - Women's 10m Air Pistol SH1	2016	Rio de Janeiro, BRA	193.4

1	P4 - Mixed 50m Pistol SH1	2016	Rio de Janeiro, BRA	189.5

3	P2 - Women's 10m Air Pistol SH1	2012	London, GBR	469.0

World Championships

1	P2 - Women's 10m Air Pistol SH1	2018	Cheongju, KOR	237.6

1	P4 - Mixed 50m Pistol SH1	2018	Cheongju, KOR	224.5

1	P2 - Women's 10m Air Pistol SH1	2014	Suhl, GER	195.6

2	P2 - Women's 10m Air Pistol SH1	2019	Sydney, NSW, AUS	233.6

2	Women's P2 - 10m Air Pistol SH1 - Team	2014	Suhl, GER	1081

4	P4 - Mixed 50m Pistol SH1	2019	Sydney, NSW, AUS	183.8

4	Mixed P6 - 10m Air Pistol SH1 - Team	2019	Sydney, NSW, AUS	360.1

Asian Para Games

1	P2 - Women's 10m Air Pistol SH1	2018	Jakarta, INA	237.6

1	P4 - Mixed 50m Pistol SH1	2018	Jakarta, INA	220.5

References

External links 
 
 

1984 births
Living people
Iranian female sport shooters
Paralympic shooters of Iran
Paralympic gold medalists for Iran
Paralympic bronze medalists for Iran
Paralympic medalists in shooting
Shooters at the 2012 Summer Paralympics
Shooters at the 2016 Summer Paralympics
Medalists at the 2012 Summer Paralympics
Medalists at the 2016 Summer Paralympics
Shooters at the 2020 Summer Paralympics
Medalists at the 2020 Summer Paralympics
21st-century Iranian women